The Flynn Hills are a mountain range in Mendocino County, California.

References 

California Coast Ranges
Mountain ranges of Mendocino County, California